Jeolpyeon is a type of tteok (rice cake) made of non-glutinous rice flour. Unlike when making siru-tteok or baekseolgi, the rice flour steamed in siru is pounded into a dough, divided into small pieces, and patterned with a tteoksal (rice cake stamp). The stamps can be wooden, ceramic, or bangjja (bronze), with various patterns including flowers, letters, or a cartwheel. When served, sesame oil is brushed over jeolpyeon.

Varieties 
If white seolgi is pounded, it becomes white jeolpyeon. Sometimes, the tteok is steamed and pounded with Korean mugwort, resulting in dark green ssuk-jeolpyeon. Another dark-green jeolpyeon, made with deltoid synurus, is called surichwi-jeolpyeon and is traditionally served during the Dano festival. Pink-colored jeolpyeon, called songgi-jeolpyeon, is made by pounding tteok with pine endodermis.

Gallery

See also 
 Jeungpyeon
 Songpyeon
 Surichwi

References 

Tteok
Steamed foods